Warren D. Berry is a retired lieutenant general in the United States Air Force who last served as the Deputy Chief of Staff for Logistics, Engineering and Force Protection.

Effective dates of promotions

References 

 

 

Air War College alumni
Embry–Riddle Aeronautical University
Living people
Recipients of the Air Force Distinguished Service Medal
Recipients of the Defense Superior Service Medal
Recipients of the Legion of Merit
United States Air Force generals
University of Notre Dame alumni
Year of birth missing (living people)